It's a Guitar World is the thirty-first studio album by guitarist Chet Atkins, released in 1966.

Atkins serves up a mixture of late 1960s pop and world music. Harihar Rao adds sitar to "January in Bombay" and "Ranjana" with some interesting and also somewhat mystifying results. Recent hits by The Tijuana Brass - "A Taste of Honey" and "What Now My Love" also get covered here. It reached #19 on the Billboard Country Albums chart and No. 148 on the Pop Albums chart.

Reception

Writing for Allmusic, critic Richard S.  Ginell wrote of the reissue "This attractive LP from Chester Burton Atkins purports to leap international boundaries, but for the most part, he stays right home in Nashville."

Reissues
 It's a Guitar World was reissued on CD along with My Favorite Guitars in 1995 on One Way Records.

Track listing

Side one
 "What'd I Say" (Ray Charles) – 2:13
 "Cast Your Fate to the Wind" (Vince Guaraldi) – 2:23
 "Lara's Theme (from Doctor Zhivago)" (Maurice Jarre) – 3:10
 "A Taste of Honey" (Ric Marlow, Bobby Scott) – 2:41
 "For No One" (Lennon–McCartney) – 2:07

Side two
 "Pickin' Nashville" (Joe Layne, Jimmy Wilkerson) – 2:21
 "January in Bombay" (Atkins) – 3:05
 "Ranjana" (Harihar Rao) – 2:20
 "Et Maintenant (What Now My Love)" (Gilbert Bécaud, Pierre Delanoë, Carl Sigman) – 3:15
 "'Na voce, 'na chitarra e'o poco 'e luna" (Ugo Calise, C. A. Rosa) – 2:22
 "Star-Time" (Leon Payne) – 2:15
 "Sempre" (Sonny Osborne) – 2:52

Personnel
Chet Atkins – guitar
Harihar Rao - sitar

References

1967 albums
Chet Atkins albums
Albums produced by Chet Atkins
Albums produced by Bob Ferguson (music)
RCA Victor albums
Albums produced by Felton Jarvis